Keita Suzuki (born 20 December 1997) is a Japanese footballer who plays as a defender or midfielder for Daegu FC.

Career
Before the second half of 2017–18, Suzuki signed for Montenegrin second tier side Podgorica, helping them earn promotion to the Montenegrin top flight. Before the 2022 season, he signed for Daegu FC in the South Korean top flight. On 19 February 2022, he debuted for Daegu FC during a 2–0 loss to FC Seoul.

Notes

References

External links
 

1997 births
Living people
Japanese footballers
Association football defenders
Association football midfielders
Japanese expatriate footballers
FK Ibar Rožaje players
FK Berane players
FK Podgorica players
Daegu FC players
Montenegrin Second League players
Montenegrin First League players
K League 1 players
Japanese expatriate sportspeople in Montenegro
Japanese expatriate sportspeople in South Korea
Expatriate footballers in Montenegro
Expatriate footballers in South Korea